Tsurmakhi (Dargwa: ЦӀурмахьи) is a rural locality (a selo) in Nizhnemulebkinsky Selsoviet, Sergokalinsky District, Republic of Dagestan, Russia. The population was 338 as of 2010. There is 1 street.

Geography 
Tsurmakhi is located 29 km southwest of Sergokala (the district's administrative centre) by road. Arachanamakhi and Nizhneye Mulebki are the nearest rural localities.

Nationalities 
Dargins live there.

References 

Rural localities in Sergokalinsky District